Allodemis pullatana is a species of moth of the family Tortricidae. It is found on Java.

References

Moths described in 1902
Archipini
Moths of Indonesia
Taxa named by Pieter Cornelius Tobias Snellen